Kayole is a low-income neighbourhood in the city of Nairobi.

Location
It borders other low-income neighbourhoods such as Donholm, Njiru, Obama, Buruburu, Tena, Saika and Umoja. Electorally, Kayole is placed under Embakasi Central Constituency; the whole constituency is within the Embakasi and Njiru sub-counties.

Overview
Kayole is generally a low-income, high-density, mixed-use neighbourhood located in Nairobi's Eastlands area. It encompasses other smaller neighbourhoods such as Sabasaba and Kayole-Soweto. Due to its affordability, Kayole hosts low-income earners, holding a significant percentage of the city's population. The neighbourhood exhibits characteristics of a slum; has a mix of storey buildings as well as slum-like structures especially in Kayole-Soweto slum to the south. A significant number of residents in Kayole are unemployed, live in abject poverty, and can barely raise $1 a day.

In terms of security, Kayole is riddled with criminal gangs, kidnappings, armed and aggravated robberies, theft, as well as child trafficking. With a significant number of crimes committed by female perpetrators. The criminal gangs are distinct from other gangs in neighbourhoods such as: Mathare, Huruma, Dandora and Eastleigh. Reports of extra-judicial killings by law enforcement in Kayole are also high.

As of 2019, Kayole has a population of 189,189, with 70,461 of them being residents of Kayole North, 118,728 in Kayole Central and Kayole South.

References

Suburbs of Nairobi
Populated places in Nairobi Province